Onyekachi Wambu (born 1960) is a Nigerian-British journalist and writer. He has directed television documentaries for the BBC, Channel 4 and PBS.

Life
Onyekachi Wambu was born in Nigeria in 1960. In 1970, after the Nigerian Civil War, he and his family moved to the UK. He attended the Stationers' Company's School in Hornsey, north London, then studied at the University of Essex, graduating with a degree in Government and Politics, after which he earned a postgraduate degree in International Relations from Selwyn College, Cambridge.

In 1983 he became a journalist, and in the late 1980s, was editor of The Voice newspaper, launching the "Innvervision" column. He is also a regular contributor to New African magazine. He worked as a senior producer and director at BBC Television, where his many credits included Ebony, Ebony People, Ain't No Black in the Union Jack and Will to Win. In the late 1990s, he worked in the US for two years making the PBS documentary Hopes on the Horizon,

In 2002 Wambu became information officer at the African Foundation for Development (AFFORD), where he is currently Executive Director.

Works

Books
 (ed.) Empire Windrush: fifty years of writing about Black Britain. London: Victor Gollancz, 1998. Published in the United States under the title Hurricane hits England: an anthology of writing about Black Britain.
 A Fuller Picture. London: BFI, 1999.
 (with Nicholas Awde) Igbo-English, English-Igbo dictionary and phrasebook. New York: Hippocrene Books, 1999.
 Lord John Taylor of Warwick. London: Tamarind Books, 2000.
 (ed.) Under the tree of talking: leadership for change in Africa. London: Counterpoint, 2007.

Documentaries
 Hopes on the Horizon, 2001. PBS.

References

External links 
 "Onyekachi Wambu - Return Of The Icons". YouTube, 24 August 2021.

1960 births
20th-century British journalists
21st-century British journalists
Alumni of Selwyn College, Cambridge
Alumni of the University of Essex
Black British journalists
Black British writers
British newspaper editors
Living people
Nigerian emigrants to the United Kingdom
People educated at the Stationers' Company's School